Miss Belgium 2016 was the 48th edition of the Miss Belgium held on January 9, 2016 at the Plopsaland Theater in  De Panne, Belgium. The winner, Lenty Frans  from Antwerp, was crowned by the outgoing title holder, Annelies Törös (Miss Belgium 2015). Frans represented Belgium at Miss World 2016 and Stephanie Geldhof, first runner-up represented at Miss Universe 2016.

Winner and runners-up

Special awards

Official Contestants
30 candidates competed for the title:

Contestants Notes  
 Lenty Frans placed in top 11 in Miss World 2016 in Washington, D.C., United States. She also won the title of Miss World Europe.
 Stephanie Geldhof unplaced in Miss Universe 2016 in Manila, Philippines.
 Emily Vanhoutte has finished 1st runner-up in Beauty of the World 2013 in Bishkek, Kirghizistan. She also unplaced in Miss Earth 2014 in Quezon City, Philippines.

Judges
The Miss Belgium 2016 final judges were:

 Darline Devos -  President of Committee Miss Belgium
 Annelien Coorevits - Miss Belgium 2007
 Virginie Claes - Miss Belgium 2006
 Daniel Dedave - Official photographer
 Roberto Bellarosa - Belgian singer and the first winner of The Voice Belgique.
 Nádine -  South African Afrikaans singer and presenter.
 Michaël Espinho - Radio and television host.

References

External links

Miss Belgium
2016 beauty pageants
2016 in Belgium